Events from the year 1566 in India.

Events

 The Tomb of Humayun in Delhi is completed.
 Vellore Fort, a large fort situated in Vellore Tamil Nadu, India is built
Agra became the seat of Moghul government (until 1658).

Births

Deaths

References

See also

 Timeline of Indian history